Sky Ridge station is a light rail station in Lone Tree, Colorado, part of the Regional Transportation District (RTD) system in the Denver metropolitan area. It is served by two lines: the E Line to Union Station and R Line to Aurora. However, the R Line currently terminates at Lincoln station due to low ridership in this area of Lone Tree which is still under construction and amid generally lower ridership due to the impact of the COVID-19 pandemic on public transport.

The station consists of two side platforms located adjacent to the Sky Ridge Medical Center, near the intersection of Interstate 25 and Sky Ridge Avenue. The station has ten bicycle racks. This station was built as part of the  Southeast Rail Extension to RidgeGate, which began in 2016 and cost $223 million. It opened on May 17, 2019.

References 

RTD light rail stations
Railway stations in the United States opened in 2019
Transportation buildings and structures in Douglas County, Colorado